Olopatadine, sold under the brand name Opatanol among others, is a medication used to decrease the symptoms of allergic conjunctivitis and allergic rhinitis (hay fever). It is used as eye drops or as a nasal spray. The eye drops generally result in an improvement within half an hour.

Common side effects include headache, sore throat, eye discomfort, change in taste. More significant side effects may include sleepiness. It is unclear if use during pregnancy or breastfeeding is safe. It is an antihistamine and mast cell stabilizer.

Olopatadine was patented in 1986 and came into medical use in 1997. It is available as a generic medication. In 2020, it was the 268th most commonly prescribed medication in the United States, with more than 1million prescriptions.

Side effects
Some known side effects include headache (7% of occurrence), eye burning and/or stinging (5%), blurred vision, dry eyes, foreign body sensation, hyperemia, keratitis, eyelid edema, pruritus, asthenia, sore throat (pharyngitis), rhinitis, sinusitis, taste perversion, and vomiting.

Chemistry

Synthesis

Pharmacology

Pharmacodynamics
Olopatadine acts as a selective antagonist of the histamine H1 receptor, thus stabilizing mast cells and inhibiting histamine release.

History
Olopatadine was patented in 1986 by Kyowa Hakko Kogyo and came into medical use in 1997.

In the United States, Pataday Twice Daily Relief was first approved by the FDA in 1996, under the name Patanol as a prescription drug and was indicated for the treatment of the signs and symptoms of allergic conjunctivitis (referring to ocular redness and itching due to allergies). Pataday – now Pataday Once Daily Relief – was first approved by the FDA in 2004, as a prescription drug and was indicated for the treatment of ocular itching associated with allergic conjunctivitis. These drugs are mast cell stabilizers, which work by preventing the release of histamine and therefore prevent or control allergic disorders. 

In February 2020, Pataday Twice Daily Relief and Pataday Once Daily Relief were switched to be over-the-counter drugs in the United States when the FDA granted the approvals of the nonprescription products to Alcon.

Society and culture

Brand names 
Brand names include Pazeo, Pataday, Patanol S, Patanol, Opatanol, Olopat, Patanase. It is also available as an oral tablet in Japan under the tradename Allelock, manufactured by Kyowa Hakko Kogyo.

References

External links 
 
 
 

Acetic acids
Alcon brands
Dibenzoxepins
Dimethylamino compounds
H1 receptor antagonists
Mast cell stabilizers
Muscarinic antagonists
Novartis brands
Oxygen heterocycles
Wikipedia medicine articles ready to translate